Juan Carlos Bernegger (born 3 March 1969) is an Argentine-Swiss football manager and a former player who played as a midfielder.

Managerial career
Bernegger had a brief career in football with Belgrano in Argentina and then Winterthur in Switzerland, but had to retire because of ligament injuries in 1993 at the age of 21. Bernegger decided to stay in Switzerland, and made his name as a youth scout and youth coach for Winterthur. Bernegger became long-term youth coach for Grasshopper, and after a couple stints at Basel U21 and Luzern rejoined Grasshopper as the head manager in 2016.

On 4 May 2022, FC Thun announced that Bernegger will leave the club at the end of the 2021–22 season.

Personal life
Bernegger's grandparents emigrated from St. Gallen, Switzerland to Argentina after World War II.

References

External links 
Footmercato Profile
FuPa Profile
Mackolik Profile
Winterthur Profile
ZeroZero Profile

1969 births
Living people
Sportspeople from Córdoba Province, Argentina
Argentine footballers
Argentine football managers
Swiss men's footballers
Swiss football managers
Argentine people of Swiss descent
Swiss people of Argentine descent
Sportspeople of Argentine descent
Association football midfielders
Argentine Primera División players
Swiss Challenge League players
Club Atlético Belgrano footballers
FC Winterthur players
FC Luzern managers
Grasshopper Club Zürich managers
FC Thun managers